Eclectic Society may refer to:
 Eclectic Society (Christian) - English missionary and anti-slavery society, founded in London in 1783.
 Eclectic Society (fraternity) - American college fraternity, Phi Nu Theta, founded at Wesleyan University in 1838.